Anders Torstenson may refer to:

 Anders Torstenson (politician) (1641-1686), Swedish statesman
 Anders Torstensson (football manager) (born 1966), Swedish football manager